The Harvard Crimson fencing team is the intercollegiate fencing team for Harvard University located in Cambridge, Massachusetts. The team competes in the Ivy League within the NCAA Division I. The university first fielded a team in 1888.

History
Harvard founded the first collegiate fencing team in the United States in 1888. The team has captured seven individual NCAA titles.

Eli Dershwitz (saber) was the seventh Harvard fencer to compete in the Olympics when he fenced for Team USA at the 2016 Rio Olympics, with the prior two having been Emily Cross '09 (Team USA; she won a silver medal in team foil) and Noam Mills '12 (Team Israel; épée), who both competed in the 2008 Beijing Olympics. Cross and Mills were the first Harvard University female fencers to qualify for the Olympics.

Notable former fencers

Harvard's Athlete of the Year Recipients 
Emily Cross, 2006 Female 
Benji Ungar, 2006 Male

Harvard's Athlete of the Year Runners-Up 
Tim Hagamen, 2007 Male 
Caroline Vloka, 2010 Female

Other
  
Eli Dershwitz, Under-20 World Saber Champion, US Olympic saber fencer, #1 in the world in saber as of July 2018.
Noam Mills, Junior World Champion and Israeli Olympic épée fencer.

Student admission controversy
On November 16, 2020, former longtime Harvard Crimson fencing coach Peter Brand was arrested and charged under federal law with accepting over $1.5 million in bribes to arrange for the two sons of Maryland business Jie (Jack) Zhao to be admitted to the university as fencing recruits. Zhao was arrested and charged with making the bribes as well. In 2016, Zhao paid $1.5 million and also acquired Brand's previous home in 2016 for $989,500.

Championships

NCAA Championships Individual Winners 
1987 - Jim O'Neill '88 in épée.
 1994 - Kwame van Leeuwen '94 in foil.
2005 - Emily Cross '09 in foil.
2006 - Benji Ungar ’09 in épée.
2007 - Tim Hagamen '07 in saber.
2010 - Caroline Vloka '12 in saber.
2011 - Alexandra Kiefer '14 in foil.
2014 - Adrienne Jarocki '17 in saber.
2016 - Adrienne Jarocki '17 in saber.
2017 - Eli Dershwitz in saber.
2018 - Eli Dershwitz in saber.
2022 - Elizabeth Tartakovsky in saber.
2022 - Filip Dolegiewicz in saber.

NCAA Championships Overall 
2006 Champions

IFA Championships Individual Winners
2009 - Benji Ungar ’09 in épée.
2009 - Caroline Vloka '12 in saber.

References

External links
 

 
Sports clubs established in 1888
Harvard Crimson
1888 establishments in Massachusetts
Fencing clubs
College fencing in the United States